A horizontal elevator may refer to:
 A person conveyor, such as a moving walkway
 A people mover, a small vehicle travelling automatically on a rail or road surface